The 1973–74 All-Ireland Senior Club Football Championship was the fourth staging of the All-Ireland Senior Club Football Championship since its establishment by the Gaelic Athletic Association in 1970-71.

Nemo Rangers were the defending champions, however, they failed to qualify after being beaten by St. Finbarr's in the 1973 Cork County Championship.

On 28 April 1974, University College Dublin won the championship following a 0-14 to 1-04 defeat of Clan na Gael in the All-Ireland final replay at Croke Park. It was their first ever championship title.

Results

Munster Senior Club Football Championship

First round

Semi-finals

Final

All-Ireland Senior Club Football Championship

Semi-finals

Finals

Championship statistics

Miscellaneous

 University College Dublin won the Leinster Club Championship for the first time in their history.
 Knockmore won the Connacht Club Championship title for the first time in their history.

References

1973 in Gaelic football
1974 in Gaelic football